The Skagit Valley Tulip Festival is a tulip festival in the Skagit Valley of Washington state, United States. It is held annually in the spring, April 1 to April 30.

History

Around 1883, George Gibbs, an immigrant from England, moved to Orcas Island, where he began to grow apples and hazelnuts. Nine years later, he purchased five dollars' worth of flower bulbs to grow, and when he dug them up a couple years later and saw how they had multiplied, realized the potential for bulb-growing in the Puget Sound region. He contacted Dutch growers in Holland to learn about the business, only to find the Dutch to be highly secretive about their commercial practices. However, when he shipped off a few a bulbs to Holland, the impressed Dutch growers traveled to Orcas Island to see for themselves how tulips could grow outside Holland.

In 1899, Gibbs wrote to the United States Department of Agriculture regarding the commercial prospects of bulb-growing in the region, and they took interest. In 1905, they sent Gibbs 15,000 imported bulbs from Holland to grow as an experiment, under a contract. The experiment was so successful that the United States Department of Agriculture established its own 10-acre test garden in 1908 around Bellingham, which proved successful enough for the Bellingham Tulip Festival to begin in 1920 to showcase and celebrate the success of the bulb industry.

The Bellingham Tulip Festival was discontinued in 1930, due to the Great Depression and bulb freezes in 1916, 1925, and 1929 that brought heavy losses to the growers. Subsequently, the growers moved south into Skagit County.

In 1946, William Roozen arrived in the United States, leaving behind a successful bulb-growing business spanning six generations in Holland. After working on several different farms, Roozen started his own in Skagit County in 1950. In 1955, he purchased the Washington Bulb Company, making him the leader among the four flower-growing families in the area, and making the Washington Bulb Company the leading grower of tulip, daffodil, and iris bulbs in North America. The farm operates a public display garden and gift shop called Roozengaarde, which, alongside the DeGoede family's Tulip Town, is a major attraction during the Tulip Festival.

Local tulip growers showcased their bulbs through display gardens for decades prior to the formation of an official festival. The Mount Vernon Chamber of Commerce established the Skagit Valley Tulip Festival as a three-day event in 1984 to add festivities during the bloom month. The event has since grown to a month-long event and coincides with street fairs, art shows and sporting events.

The 2020 festival was cancelled on March 25 due to the coronavirus pandemic, which had affected Skagit County. Festival organizers had initially planned for a smaller event with limited numbers of people allowed at display gardens and later car-only tours, but cancelled after the state government issued a stay-at-home order. Tulip Town, a major festival venue, announced plans to use virtual tours and flower donations for hospital workers to recoup their lost revenue. Several tulip fields were prematurely cut to prevent people from visiting the area.

Attendance
The festival claims to be Washington's largest, with over one million visitors; at least one news source stated attendance was 350,000 for 2008. Travel + Leisure put the figure at 500,000 in 2003.

Awards
The festival was selected as the best street fair in KING-TV's "Best of the Northwest" awards in 2010.

Gallery

References

Further reading
 Tulipmania: the Skagit Valley Tulip Festival: official festival guidebook, 1989, 

Festivals in Washington (state)
Spring festivals in the United States
Mount Vernon, Washington
Tourist attractions in Skagit County, Washington
Flower festivals in the United States
1984 establishments in Washington (state)
Recurring events established in 1984